Dekaton was a settlement and station of ancient Bithynia on the road east of Nicomedia, 10 Roman miles east of Nicomedia, whence the name.

Its site is located near 10 Roman miles east of Nicomedia in Asiatic Turkey.

References

Populated places in Bithynia
Former populated places in Turkey
History of Kocaeli Province